Mike Nugent (born February 10, 1980) is an American retired professional soccer player.

Playing career 
Nugent was named Ivy League player of the year in 2001 while at Princeton University.

Statistics

References

External links 
 Profile on MetroFanatic
 

1980 births
Living people
Soccer players from Boston
American soccer players
Association football forwards
Princeton Tigers men's soccer players
Chicago Fire FC draft picks
Chicago Fire FC players
New York Red Bulls players
Major League Soccer players